Kristin Turcotte, née Holman is a Canadian curler.

Personal life
Turcotte is married to fellow curler Bob Turcotte.

Teams and events

Women's

Mixed

References

External links
 
 Kristin Turcotte – Curling Canada Stats Archive
 John Turcotte Obituary - Kingsville, TX | Corpus-Christi Caller-Times ("...and Kristin Turcotte of Vancouver, British Columbia")

Living people
Canadian women curlers
Canadian women's curling champions
Year of birth missing (living people)